Jianping Yao is currently a Distinguished University Professor and University Research Chair, and previously Director of the Ottawa-Carleton Institute for Electrical and Computer Engineering, at the University of Ottawa, and also an author of over 600 scientific papers. He is Editor-in-Chief of IEEE Photonics Technology Letters. Dr. Yao is known for his original contributions to microwave photonics. He is a Fellow of the Institute of Electrical and Electronics Engineers, the Optical Society, the Canadian Academy of Engineering, and the Royal Society of Canada.

References

Canadian engineers
Academic staff of the University of Ottawa
Nanyang Technological University alumni
Year of birth missing (living people)
Living people